Emma Ekenman-Fernis (born 24 July 1996) is a Swedish handball player for Lugi HF and the Swedish national team.

Individual awards
 All-Star Team as best Right wing at the Youth European Championship 2013

References

1996 births
Living people
Handball players from Stockholm
Swedish female handball players
Handball players at the 2014 Summer Youth Olympics
IK Sävehof players
Lugi HF players
21st-century Swedish women